Mamalakalkkappurathu is a 1988 Indian Malayalam-language drama film written and directed by Ramasimhan. The film stars Manoj K. Jayan, Anil, Elias and Kilimol in the lead roles. The film has musical score by Mohan Sithara. The film won the Kerala State Film Award for Best Debut Director.

Plot

Cast
Manoj K. Jayan
Anil
Elias
Kilimol
Manakkad Usha
Master Hari
Nazer
Rathna Purushothaman
Libu Philip
Xavier
Sheela

Soundtrack
The music was composed by Mohan Sithara and the lyrics were written by Ali Akbar and T. C. John.

References

External links
 

1988 films
1980s Malayalam-language films
Films scored by Mohan Sithara